Acacia blaxellii, also known as Blaxell's wattle, is a shrub belonging to the genus Acacia and the subgenus Phyllodineae endemic to Western Australia.

Description
It has fine to densely haired branchlets. The phyllodes are ascending to erect with a straight oblong-elliptic to narrowly oblong shape. The seed pods that form after flowering are variably undulate with an irregular sigmoid shape.

Taxonomy
The species was first formally described by the botanist Bruce Maslin in 1999 as part of the work Acacia miscellany. The taxonomy of fifty-five species of Acacia, primarily Western Australian, in section Phyllodineae (Leguminosae: Mimosoideae) as published in the journal Nuytsia. It was reclassified as Racosperma blaxellii in 2003 by Leslie Pedley then transferred back into the genus Acacia in 2006.

Distribution
It has a disjunct distribution in the eastern Wheatbelt and western parts of the Goldfields-Esperance regions of Western Australia from between Kondinin in the west and Norseman in the east where it is found on flats and on low rocky rises growing in clay-loam soils and is often part of mallee scrub or open Eucalyptus'' woodland communities.

See also
 List of Acacia species

References

blaxellii
Acacias of Western Australia
Plants described in 1999
Taxa named by Bruce Maslin